Mexcala monstrata is a jumping spider species in the genus Mexcala that lives in Yemen. The female was first described in 1994 and the male in 2007.

References

Spiders described in 1994
Invertebrates of the Arabian Peninsula
Salticidae
Spiders of Asia
Taxa named by Wanda Wesołowska